Bayancholi, also rendered as Bayan Chowli, may refer to:
 Bayancholi-ye Ajam
 Bayancholi-ye Kord